Pyramidobela agyrtodes is a moth in the family Oecophoridae. It is found from in southern North America from extreme western Texas to southern Chihuahua and Nuevo León.

The ground color of the forewings is pale gray, lightly speckled with pale brownish, although the costal half is scattered with ocherous. The ground color of the hindwings is whitish, basally becoming gray-brown toward the apex. Adults are on wing from April to May (in Texas), July (southern Chihuahua) to September (northern Chihuahua).

References

Moths described in 1927
Oecophoridae